A Caridá (Spanish: La Caridad) is one of eight parishes (administrative divisions) in the El Franco municipality, within the province and autonomous community of Asturias, in northern Spain. 

The population is 1,796 (INE 2007).

Villages
 Arboces
 Llóngara
 El Porto/Viavélez

References

Parishes in El Franco